Cubism is a 2007 DVD release of Pet Shop Boys' Fundamental tour. Filmed on November 14, 2006 at the Auditorio Nacional in Mexico. The DVD  contains a short documentary, a gallery and audio commentary as special features.

Track listing
 "Psycho Intro"
 "God Willing"
 "Psychological"
 "Left to my own devices"
 "I'm with Stupid"
 "Suburbia"
 "Can you forgive her?"
 "Minimal/Shopping"
 "Rent"
 "Dreaming of the Queen"
 "Heart"
 "Opportunities/Integral"
 "Numb"
 "Se a vida é/Domino dancing"
 "Flamboyant"
 "Home and dry"
 "Always on my mind"
 "Where the streets have no name (I can't take my eyes off you)"
 "West End girls"
 "The Sodom and Gomorrah Show"
 "So hard/It's a sin"
 "Go West"

Special features
 Photo gallery montage 
 Behind the scenes documentary called "Pet Shop Boys in Mexico"
 Audio commentary with Neil Tennant, Chris Lowe and David Barnard

External links
 Pet Shop Boys – official website 

2007 video albums
Pet Shop Boys video albums